Derrius Brooks (born May 29, 1988) is an American football defensive back who is currently a free agent. He played college football at Western Kentucky University and attended Harris County High School in Hamilton, Georgia. He has also been a member of the Cincinnati Bengals, Calgary Stampeders, New Orleans Saints, Tampa Bay Buccaneers, Saskatchewan Roughriders and Hamilton Tiger-Cats.

Professional career

Cincinnati Bengals
Brooks was signed by the Cincinnati Bengals of the National Football League (NFL) on May 2, 2012 after going undrafted in the 2012 NFL Draft. He was released by the Bengals on May 11, 2012.

Calgary Stampeders
Brooks signed with the CFL's Calgary Stampeders on July 20, 2012. He played for the Stampeders during the 2012 and 2013 CFL seasons, making 20 appearances during those two seasons and contributing 50 tackles, 9 special teams tackles and 5 interceptions.

New Orleans Saints
Brooks was signed by the New Orleans Saints of the NFL on January 2, 2014. He was released by the Saints on August 30, 2014.

Tampa Bay Buccaneers
On September 1, 2014, Brooks was signed to the practice squad of the Tampa Bay Buccaneers of the NFL. His contract expired on January 5, 2015.

Saskatchewan Roughriders
The Saskatchewan Roughriders of the CFL announced the signing of Brooks on January 11, 2016. He was released by the Riders on October 3, 2016, having never played a snap for them.

Hamilton Tiger-Cats 
On October 10, 2016, Brooks signed with the Hamilton Tiger-Cats of the CFL, and appeared in 3 games in the months of October and November 2016. Brooks was taken to the hospital after being taken off the field on a stretcher, however all the tests came back negative and he was released from the hospital later that night. He was released by the Tiger-Cats in the week leading up to their first playoff game.

Columbus Lions 
In December 2016, Brooks signed with the Columbus Lions of the National Arena League. On May 18, 2017, Brooks was released.

References

External links
Just Sports Stats

Living people
1988 births
American football defensive backs
Canadian football defensive backs
African-American players of American football
African-American players of Canadian football
Western Kentucky Hilltoppers football players
Cincinnati Bengals players
Calgary Stampeders players
New Orleans Saints players
Tampa Bay Buccaneers players
Saskatchewan Roughriders players
Hamilton Tiger-Cats players
Columbus Lions players
Players of American football from Columbus, Georgia
21st-century African-American sportspeople
20th-century African-American people